The ZF 4HP16 transmission is an automatic transmission with 4 forward gears, one reverse and electronic hydraulic control. It is designed for use in a vehicle with front-wheel drive and a transverse engine. The transmission is operated via selector lever and possibly also via switch. The 4HP-16 transmission has a hydrodynamic torque converter with a controller slip lock-up clutch.

A planetary gear train establishes the mechanical gear ratios. The integral constant radio can be adapted to the engine's power output and the vehicle's weight. The electronic-hydraulic control makes controlled power shifts and various shift programs possible. In selector level position "P", the output is locked mechanically.

4HP16